In 1182 Raynald of Châtillon the Crusader Lord of Oultrejordain launched a squadron of ships on the Red Sea in order to conduct raids on Muslim Red Sea ports and to attack the Muslim holy cities of Mecca or Medina.

Raynald already had a reputation as a rogue Crusader lord, having conducted a brutal raid on Cyprus and having tortured Aimery of Limoges, the Patriarch of Antioch, to force him into giving him funds for his military adventures.

Raynald had the materials for five ships carted overland in 'kit form' from his castle at Kerak in Oultrejordain to the Gulf of Aqaba (an arm of the Red Sea). Raynald seized the port of Ayla and blockaded the nearby island known to the Crusaders as Ile de Graye.

Raynald's squadron of ships sailed the length of the Gulf of Aqaba and crossed over to the western shore of the Red Sea raiding Egyptian ports and sea caravans. After sacking the port of Aidhab the expedition crossed back over to the eastern (Arabian) shore and attacked ports along the coast from Rabigh (90 miles north of Jeddah) to al-Haura.

In Egypt Al-Adil, brother of the Ayyubid ruler Saladin, had ships transferred from Alexandria and Fustat to the Red Sea to pursue the Frankish raiders. The Ayyubid fleet was under the command of Husam ad-Din Lu'lu', an admiral of Armenian origin. Lu'lu' broke the blockade of Ile de Gray destroying two of Raynald's ships.
 
The Muslim fleet sailed down the Red Sea and caught the Frankish ships at anchor. Raynald's raiders beached their ships and fled into the Arabian desert. Lu'lu' pursued them. The Crusaders received help from some local Bedouin. For five days Lu'lu's forces pursued the Franks and then succeeded in capturing almost all of the raiders.

Despite Al-Adil initially granting quarter to the captive raiders, he was overruled by his brother Saladin who was adamant that because the Franks had shown the feasibility of attacking the holy cities of Islam they must be executed so that word of their incursions would not reach the Crusaders in Outremer.

Raynald, the author of this unprecedented incursion, managed to escape back to his fortress at Kerak in Oultrejordain.

References

Further reading

1182 in Asia
12th century in the Ayyubid Sultanate
Conflicts in 1182
History of the Red Sea
Red Sea
1180s in the Crusader states